The Second Shot (German: Der zweite Schuß) is a 1923 German silent film directed by Maurice Krol and starring William Dieterle, Anton Pointner and Helga Thomas.

Cast
 William Dieterle
 Anton Pointner
 Helga Thomas
 Heddy Sven
 Ernst Dernburg
 Wilhelm Diegelmann
 Ernst Pittschau

References

Bibliography
 Bock, Hans-Michael & Bergfelder, Tim. The Concise CineGraph. Encyclopedia of German Cinema. Berghahn Books, 2009.

External links

1923 films
Films of the Weimar Republic
Films directed by Maurice Krol
German silent feature films
German black-and-white films